This is a list of Polish war films.

1 
 11 listopada by Kamil Kulczycki & Urszula Szałata, 2008
 111 dni letargu by Jerzy Sztwiertnia, 1985

A 
 Agent nr 1 by Zbigniew Kuźmiński, 1971
 Akcja pod Arsenałem by Jan Łomnicki, 1978

B 
 Biały niedźwiedź by Jerzy Zarzycki, 1959
 Bołdynby Ewa Petelska & Czesław Petelski, 1981

C 
 C.K. Dezerterzy by Janusz Majewski, 1986
 Ciemna rzeka by Sylwester Szyszko, 1973
 Czarna suknia by Janusz Majewski, 1967
 Czas honoru by Michał Kwieciński, Michał Rosa, Wojciech Wójcik, 2008
 Czterej pancerni i pies by Konrad Nałęcki & Andrzej Czekalski, 1966

D 
 Daleko od okna by Jan Jakub Kolski, 2000
 Demony wojny wg Goi by Władysław Pasikowski, 1998
 Do góry nogami by Stanisław Jędryka, 1982
 Dzień czwarty by Ludmiła Niedbalska, 1984
 Dziś w nocy umrze miasto by Jan Rybkowski, 1961

E 
 Eroica by Andrzej Munk, 1958

G 
 Gdzie jest generał... by Tadeusz Chmielewski, 1964
 Giuseppe w Warszawie by Stanisław Lenartowicz, 1964
 Godzina "W" by Janusz Morgenstern, 1980
 Gwiaździsta eskadra by Leonard Buczkowski, 1930

H 
 Hubal by Bohdan Poręba, 1973

J 
 Jak być kochaną by Wojciech Jerzy Has, 1963
 Jak rozpętałem drugą wojnę światową by Tadeusz Chmielewski, 1970
 Jeszcze tylko ten las by Jan Łomnicki, 1991

K 
 Kanał by Andrzej Wajda, 1957
 Kartka z podróży by Waldemar Dziki, 1983
 Kierunek Berlin by Jerzy Passendorfer, 1968
 Kolumbowie by Janusz Morgenstern, 1970
 Kornblumenblau, Leszek Wosiewicz, 1988
 Kwestia sumienia, Ewa Petelska & Czesław Petelski, 1967
 Kwiecień by Witold Lesiewicz, 1961

L 
 Lotna by Andrzej Wajda, 1959

N 
 Na białym szlaku by Jarosław Brzozowski & Andrzej Wróbel, 1962
 Nagrody i odznaczenia by Jan Łomnicki, 1974
 Nieznany by Witold Lesiewicz, 1964

O 
 Oblężenie (Stawka większa niż życie) by Andrzej Konic & Janusz Morgenstern, 1968
 Ocalić miasto by Jan Łomnicki, 1976
 Ogniomistrz Kaleń by Ewa Petelska & Czesław Petelski, 1961
ogniem i mieczem 1999
 Olimpiada '40 by Andrzej Kotkowski, 1980
 Opadły liście z drzew by Stanisław Różewicz, 1975
 Opowieść w czerwieni by Henryk Kluba, 1974
 Orzeł by Leonard Buczkowski, 1959
 Oszołomienie by Jerzy Sztwiertnia, 1989

P 
 Palace Hotel by Ewa Kruk, 1977
 Partita na instrument drewniany by Janusz Zaorski, 1975
 Pasażerka by Andrzej Munk & Witold Lesiewicz, 1963
 Pianista by Roman Polanski, 2002
 Pierścionek z orłem w koronie by Andrzej Wajda, 1992
 Pogranicze w ogniu by Andrzej Konic, 1992
 Pokolenie by Andrzej Wajda, 1955
 Polskie drogi by Janusz Morgenstern, 1977
 Potem nastąpi cisza by Janusz Morgenstern, 1966
 Pożegnania by Wojciech Jerzy Has, 1958

R 
 Ranny w lesie by Janusz Nasfeter, 1963
 Rok pierwszy by Witold Lesiewicz, 1960

S 
 Stawka większa niż życie by Andrzej Konic & Janusz Morgenstern, 1968
 Sto koni do stu brzegów by Zbigniew Kuźmiński, 1978
 Sławna jak Sarajewo by Janusz Kidawa, 1987

T 
 Tajemnica Enigmy by Roman Wionczek, 1980
 Tajemnica twierdzy szyfrów by Adek Drabiński, 2007
 Tajemnica Westerplatte by Paweł Chochlew & Jarosław Żamojda, 2009
 Trzecia część nocy by Andrzej Żuławski, 1972
 Trzecia granica by Wojciech Solarz & Lech Lorentowicz, 1976

U 
 Umarłem, aby żyć by Stanisław Jędryka, 1984
 Urodziny młodego warszawiaka by Ewa Petelska & Czesław Petelski, 1980

W 
 W te dni przedwiosenne by Andrzej Konic, 1975
 Westerplatte by Stanisław Różewicz, 1967
 Wielka droga by Michał Waszyński, 1946
 Wrota Europy by Jerzy Wójcik, 1999
 Wszyscy i nikt by Konrad Nałęcki, 1977
 Wyrok na Franciszka Kłosa by Andrzej Wajda, 2000
 Wyrok śmierci by Witold Orzechowski, 1980

Z 
 Za wami pójdą inni by Antoni Bohdziewicz, 1949
 Zakazane piosenki by Leonard Buczkowski, 1947
 Zamach by Jerzy Passendorfer, 1958
 Zapamiętaj imię swoje by Siergiej Kołosow, 1974
 Znicz olimpijski by Lech Lorentowicz, 1969
 Znikąd donikąd by Kazimierz Kutz, 1975
 Zwariowana noc by Zbigniew Kuźmiński, 1967
 Złoto dezerterów by Janusz Majewski, 1998

References

War
Polish